Oluwa Keith Shiri is a Zimbabwean film curator, who has been based in based in Beirut, Lebanon, and in London, UK. He has been an advisor to several film festivals, including London Film Festival, Venice Film Festival, Berlin International Film Festival, Dubai International Film Festival, Panafrican Film and Television Festival of Ouagadougou and Tampere Film Festival. He is also a founding juror at the Africa Movie Academy Awards. Keith Shiri was born on April 27, 1967.

References

Film curators
Living people
Zimbabwean film people
Year of birth missing (living people)